Pseudopeltis is a genus of fungi in the order Helotiales. The relationship of this taxon to other taxa within the order is unknown (incertae sedis), and it has not yet been placed with certainty into any family.

References

Helotiales
Hypocreales genera
Taxa described in 1978